Doreen Granpeesheh (April 8, 1963) is an Iranian-American psychologist and board certified behavior analyst who works with children diagnosed with autism spectrum disorder.

In 1990, Granpeesheh founded the Center for Autism and Related Disorders (CARD). The Blackstone Group, a private equity firm, acquired CARD in 2018. Granpeesheh and the management at CARD invested in the company alongside Blackstone, and Granpeesheh remained the CEO until December 2019, when she was replaced by Anthony Kilgore and moved into the role of executive director.

In 2014, Granpeesheh published Evidence-Based Treatment for Children with Autism: The CARD Model with co-editors Jonathan Tarbox, Adel Najdowski, and Julie Kornack.

In 2016, Granpeesheh participated in Andrew Wakefield's Vaxxed, a pseudoscientific propaganda film which pushes his widely debunked theory that the MMR vaccine causes autism. Granpeesheh features prominently in the film, falsely claiming that autism is caused by children "not detoxifying from the vaccinations" and can be treated with detoxification. Granpeesheh had previously worked for Wakefield at his clinic Thoughtful House.

References

External links
Official website

1963 births
American people of Iranian descent
American women chief executives
American women psychologists
21st-century American psychologists
Autism researchers
Iranian psychologists
Iranian women psychologists
Living people
People from Tehran
University of California, Los Angeles alumni
Iranian expatriate academics
21st-century American women
20th-century American psychologists